Göran Petersson (born 1942), is a Swedish lawyer, sailor and sports official.

Petersson got his law degree (jur.kand.) from Lund University in 1967, and has been a lawyer since 1977. He worked until his retirement at Advokatfirman Vinge in Gothenburg.

During the period 2004-2012 Petersson was the president of the International Sailing Federation (ISAF), where he succeeded Paul Henderson. He was succeeded by Carlo Croce.

During the period 2009-2017, he was a member of the International Olympic Committee (IOC).

References 

1942 births
Living people
20th-century Swedish lawyers
Lund University alumni
Swedish sports executives and administrators
Swedish referees and umpires
International Olympic Committee members
Swedish male sailors (sport)
Presidents of World Sailing
21st-century Swedish lawyers